Iconostigma is a genus of moths belonging to the family Tortricidae.

Species
Iconostigma morosa Tuck, 1981 
Iconostigma tryphaena Tuck, 1981

References

 , 1981, Systematic Entomology 6: 339. 
 , 2005, World Catalogue of Insects volume 5 Tortricidae

External links

tortricidae.com

Chlidanotini
Tortricidae genera